Kang Yong-ok (born 19 February 1974) is a North Korean judoka.  She competed in the women's extra-lightweight event at the 1992 Summer Olympics.

References

1974 births
Living people
North Korean female judoka
Olympic judoka of North Korea
Judoka at the 1992 Summer Olympics
Place of birth missing (living people)